Heikki Liimatainen may refer to:

 Heikki L, real name Heikki Liimatainen, Finnish musician
 Heikki Liimatainen (athlete) (1894-1980), Finnish runner